Sebastian Junk (born 29 November 1983) is a German Paralympic judoka who competes in international level events. He has participated at five Paralympic Games and won a bronze medal at the 2004 Summer Paralympics.

References

External links
 
 

1983 births
Living people
Sportspeople from Trier
Sportspeople from Mannheim
Paralympic judoka of Germany
Judoka at the 2000 Summer Paralympics
Judoka at the 2004 Summer Paralympics
Judoka at the 2008 Summer Paralympics
Judoka at the 2012 Summer Paralympics
Judoka at the 2016 Summer Paralympics
Medalists at the 2004 Summer Paralympics
German male judoka
21st-century German people